SaikouCon was an annual three day anime convention held during August at the Mountain Laurel Resort in White Haven, Pennsylvania. The convention's name in Japanese translates to "best convention." It was the first anime convention hosted in the Lehigh Valley.

Programming
The convention typically offered a dance party, costume contest, concerts, a merchant’s hall, tabletop games, video games, and workshops. The 2014 charity auction benefited the Dave Thomas Foundation and St. Jude's Children's Research Hospital.

History
SaikouCon for 2013 and 2014 was located at the Holiday Inn Conference Center Lehigh Valley in Breinigsville. For 2015 the convention was located at the Best Western Lehigh Valley Hotel Conference Center. SaikouCon moved from the Split Rock Resort in Lake Harmony back to Allentown for 2017, being located at the Holiday Inn Center City. The 2018 convention was held at the Econo Lodge Conference Center in Allentown. SaikouCon was postponed in 2020 due to the COVID-19 pandemic. SaikouCon 2021 was cancelled due to various issues including the event's lack of programming, with the convention also closing due to operational problems.

Event History

References

Other Related News Articles
SaikouCon Anime Convention 69News WFMZ-TV YouTube, Retrieved 29 August 2022

External links
 SaikouCon Website

Defunct anime conventions
Recurring events established in 2013
2013 establishments in Pennsylvania
Annual events in Pennsylvania
Festivals in Pennsylvania
Pennsylvania culture
Tourist attractions in Luzerne County, Pennsylvania
Conventions in Pennsylvania